Germán David Ré  (born 2 November 1981) is an Argentine football defender currently playing for Villa San Carlos.

Career
Ré made his debut for Newell's Old Boys in 2002, and went on to make over 150 appearances for the club. In 2004, he was part of the squad that won the 2004 Apertura tournament, playing mostly as a left-back. On October 29, 2008, Ré played his 200th game for Newell's in a 1–1 draw with River Plate.

On 2 February 2009, he joined Estudiantes de La Plata on a three-year contract. Later that year, the defender played in the final of Copa Libertadores, helping Estudiantes win the title for the first time since 1970. In Estudiantes, Ré has been used both as a centre-back (alongside Leandro Desábato or Christian Cellay) or as a left-back, especially after the departure of Juan Manuel Díaz in January 2010.

In 2015, he joined to Atlético de Rafaela.

Honours
Newell's Old Boys
Argentine Primera División (1): 2004 Apertura
Estudiantes
Copa Libertadores (1): 2009
Argentine Primera División (1): 2010 Apertura

References

External links
  
 
 Football-Lineups profile
 

1981 births
Living people
People from Rosario Department
Argentine footballers
Association football defenders
Argentine Primera División players
Primera Nacional players
Primera B Metropolitana players
Newell's Old Boys footballers
Estudiantes de La Plata footballers
Atlético de Rafaela footballers
Chacarita Juniors footballers
Club Atlético Villa San Carlos footballers
Sportspeople from Santa Fe Province